"Bye, baby Bunting" (Roud 11018) is an English-language nursery rhyme and lullaby.

Lyrics and melody
The most common modern version is:

Bye, baby Bunting,
Daddy's gone a-hunting,
Gone to get a rabbit skin [To get a little rabbit's skin]
To wrap the baby Bunting in.Kaye Bennett Dotson (2020). The Value of Games, p.66. Rowman & Littlefield Publishers. .

From 1784:

Origins
The expression bunting is a term of endearment that may also imply 'plump'. A version of the rhyme was published in 1731 in England. A version in Songs for the Nursery 1805 had the longer lyrics:

Bye, baby Bunting,
Father's gone a-hunting,
Mother's gone a-milking,
Sister's gone a-silking,
Brother's gone to buy a skin
To wrap the baby Bunting in.Eulalie Osgood Grover, ed. (1915). Mother Goose. P.F. Volland. .

See also
Little Baby Buntin'

Notes

External links

Lullabies
English nursery rhymes
English folk songs
English children's songs
Traditional children's songs
Year of song unknown
Songwriter unknown